Eidophasia dammersi is a moth of the  family Plutellidae. It is found in California and Arizona in the United States.

The larvae feed on Cleome isomeris.

References

Moths described in 1934
Plutellidae